The Palácio das Mangabeiras is the official residence of the governor of Minas Gerais state, Brazil. It was built after the residential area of the Palácio da Liberdade was closed.
It is located in Belo Horizonte.

Buildings and structures in Belo Horizonte
Official residences in Brazil